3-Chloropyridine is an organohalide with the formula C5H4ClN. It is a colorless liquid that is mainly used as a building block in organic synthesis.

The compound is a substrate for many coupling processes including the Heck reaction, Suzuki reaction, and Ullmann reaction.

Related compounds
 3-Bromopyridine
 2-Chloropyridine

References 

Chloropyridines
3-Pyridyl compounds